The Eduardo Avaroa Andean Fauna National Reserve (Reserva Nacional de Fauna Andina Eduardo Avaroa; Spanish acronym: REA) is located in Sur Lípez Province.  Situated in the far southwestern region of Bolivia, it is the country's most visited protected area. It is considered the most important protected area in terms of tourist influx in the Potosí Department.

Categorized under IUCN Category IV, it is primarily for the protection of birds that inhabit the different lagoons in the reserve. The reserve protects part of the Central Andean dry puna (oligothermic) ecoregion. The reserve's major attractions are erupting volcanoes, hot springs, geysers, lakes, fumaroles, mountains and its three endemic species of flamingos in particular.

History
Established in 1973, the national park is named after Eduardo Avaroa (1838–1879), the Bolivian war hero of the 19th century. It was created by Supreme Decree (SD) of 13 December 1973 and extended on May 14, 1981. Since 2009, the entire reserve is part of the larger Los Lípez Ramsar site.

Geography
The reserve is situated in the southern region of Andean mountains in southwestern Bolivia. The basin features depict active volcanoes, hot springs, geysers and fumaroles, and a parallel has been drawn with the Yellowstone National Park in the US. Its water resources are limited to lakes and salt water lagoons due to very low rainfall of  annually. Two communities, Quetena Chico and Quetena Grande, lie within the reserve.

Lakes include Laguna Verde, Laguna Colorada, Laguna Salada, Laguna Busch and Laguna Hedionda. It is named after the effect of wind and sun on the micro-organism that live in it.

An unusual natural feature of attraction (much photographed) in the reserve is an isolated rock formation projecting out of the sand dunes of Siloli at a place known as Árbol de Piedra. It is known as the “Stone Tree” as it is in the shape of a stunted tree, which is formed as a thin rock due to strong wind action.

The climate in winter (May to August) is dry, generally with no rain during the summer (December to April). The lowest temperatures are recorded during the months of May, June and July.

Mountains 
The park contains the following mountains:

Sairecabur – 5,971 m, border with Chile
Putana – 5,890 m
Licancabur – 5,920 m, border with Chile
Piedras Grandes – 5,710 m
Chijlla – 5,709 m
Callejón Chico – 5,708 m
Aguas Calientes – 5,684 m
Wilama – 5,678 m, border with Argentina
Bravo – 5,656 m
Sanabria – 5,654 m
Loromayu – 5,641 m
Silata Chahuna – 5640 m
Juriques – 5,704 m, border with Chile
Poderosa – 5,614 m
Quebrada Honda – 5,593 m
Guayaques – 5,598 m
Cahuna – 5,583 m
Waylla Yarita – 5,578 m
Amarillo – 5,560 m
Tres Cumbres – 5,509 m
Pabellón – 5,498 m
Aguita Brava – 5,485 m
Baratera – 5,484 m
Bajo – 5,468 m, border with Argentina
Puripica Chico – 5,464 m
Suri Phuyu – 5,458 m
Panizo – 5,456 m
Tinte – 5,384 m, border with Argentina
Brajma – 5,356 m
Guacha – 5,340 m
Viscachillos – 5,301 m
Lagunitas – 5,287 m
Michina – 5,537 m
Colorado – 5,264 m
Sandoncito – 5,252 m
Lagunitas – 5,203 m
Estrato – 5,193 m
Letrato – 5,193 m
Chicalin – 5,123 m
Cojita – 5,116 m
Zapaleri – 5,090 m, border with Argentina and Chile
Nelly – 5,078 m
Linzor – 5,680 m
Puntas Negras – 4,963 m
Totoral – 4,963 m
Cueva Blanca – 4,957 m
Chaco Seguro – 4,948 m
Loromita – 4,846 m

Culture

Quetena Chico, founded in the 1920s, has a population 520, while Quetena Grande, founded shortly thereafter, is the smaller of the two and has a population of 180. Although the inhabitants are of Quechua descent, their primary language is Spanish. Health care and schooling were unavailable until the 1990s, while electricity and potable water systems were also unavailable at least until 2005. Near Quetena Chico, there are some archaeological remains, jaranas (stone huts), tambos (trail markers), rock paintings, and  a ceremonial site lying in a depression between two volcanoes. Atulcha (or Chullpares), is an archeological site with mummies in a cave on Tunupa Volcano.

Economy

The most important income generating activity for the two local communities has been camelid farming, selling llama wool and meat. With the restriction on fox hunting subsequent to the REA, community members' livelihoods have been negatively affected as the fox is the principal predator of llamas. Before establishment of the REA, flamingo egg sales provided monetary income to locals. The park visitor centre is located in Quetena Chico and tourism is growing steadily as, in 2007 there were over 67,000 visitors, six times the number reported in 1997. In addition to working in the tourist trade, locals pan for gold in the Río Quetena.

Mining is a major industry in and around the reserve, rich in natural resources of veins of lead, zinc and silver. As a result, 61 mining concessions are located in the park. Also extracted are its nonmetallic mineral resources like sulfur and ulexite the evaporating mineral. Ulexite is converted to boric acid and is exported to the United States, Europe, Asia and Australia.

Flora

The reserve in the Andean has vegetation consisting of tropical alpine herbs with dwarf shrubs of the forests of Polylepis. Plant and tree species are reportedly about 190 species, in the harsh terrain, which have emerged given the conditions of salinity, lack of fresh water, low temperatures, and scarcity of nutrients. Flora restricted to this and other ecoregions include the genera Barneoudia, Hexaptera, Nototriche, Pycnophyllum and Werneria. The vegetation is characterized by the strong presence of pasture grass (straw) such as Peruvian feather grass (Stipa ichu)  in some plains and hillsides. In places with higher humidity, Tola or Thola (Parastrephia lepidophylla), Quinoa and Kenua bush tree are found. The villagers use vegetation as fuel for heating and cooking.

Fauna

The reserve is habitat for ten reptile species (including two lizards of the genus Liolaemus), amphibians and fish. Other domesticated animals that are raised in 500 villages inhabited by Quetena Grande and Quetena Chico communities are the llamas and alpacas; however, grazing by these animals on the native grasses and plants in the reserve has a detrimental effect on the conservation of the park.

The fauna is characterized by the presence of species that have adapted to extreme living conditions in the region, some of them endangered. The reserve is home to 80 species of birds. Out of six flamingo species in the world, three species, namely the Chilean, Andean and James flamingos are found in very large numbers in the freshwater lakes and saltwater lagoons of the reserve; of the  Phoenicopterus chilensis, Phoenicoparrus andinus and Phoenicoparrus jamesi flamingos in the reserve, their population recorded in 1994 as 26,600. In addition, the reserve is also the habitat for 80 more species of birds, which include the falcons, ducks, lesser rhea (Pterocnemia pennata), puna tinamou (Tinamotis pentlandii) and Andean goose (Chloephaga melanoptera). Endemic birds found in this ecoregion also include the endangered Ash-breasted tit-tyrant (Anairetes alpinus); the critically threatened royal cinclodes (Cinclodes aricomae), the vulnerable Berlepsch's canastero (Asthenes berlepschi); and species of least concern the line-fronted canastero (Asthenes urubambensis), scribble-tailed canastero (Asthenes maculicauda), short-tailed finch (Idiopsar bracyurus), and gray-bellied flower-piercer (Diglosa carbonaria).

Mammals reported in the protected reserve are 23 species, which include pumas, Andean foxes (Pseudalopex culpaeus) and vizcacha (rabbit -like), and also Endangered species of vicuñas (Vicugna vicugna), suri, Andean condor, keñua, puma (Felis concolor), andean cat (Felis jacobita), and quirquincho (Chaetophractus nationi).

Threats
The region of Polylepis forests as a whole has been subject to heavy degradation. The overuse of Polylepis tarapacana, and Azorella compacta has brought the reserve under severe stress. It is due to overgrazing by domesticated animals, use of forest trees for fuel, burning, clearance for cultivation and due to dumping of tailings or mining wastes. Tourism is also perceived as a threat to the park environment and the tourism industry has reported a visitation of a large number of people annually to the reserve; the security forces engaged for protecting the park is inadequate to meet this challenge. Human disturbance, soil erosion, wastes in lakes and lagoons, and fecal coliform runoff from waste are also identified reasons affecting the conservation of flamingos.

Conservation

The Conservancy and the Bolivian National Protected Areas Service (SERNAP) has the onus for operating and maintaining the reserve with its trained 14 park guards who are provided with patrol vehicles and two-way radios. However, keeping in view the growing influx of tourists to the park and other threats from other sources as reported, SERNAP has prepared a Master Plan for park management plan subsuming ecotourism as an essential component to generate financial resources. According to Andy Drumm, director of the Ecotourism Program, entrance fees at the reserve amounted to about $200,000 in 2006. This necessitated a scientific study on the carrying capacity of the reserve due to large influx of tourists. However, SERNAP is associating the TROPICO (created in 1986 as a non-governmental, non-profit organization for biodiversity conservation in Bolivia.) as its conservancy partner to introduce and enforce environmental regulations in the reserve.

Parks in Peril (PiP), a program of intervention, a collaboration between "the U.S. Agency for International Development (USAID), and the Nature Conservancy to Preserve our Natural Heritage" provided funding for conservations works of the reserve, which is one of the most economically backward areas. This funding, provided between 1999 and 2002, enabled PiP to work in association with the SERNAP and the Nature Conservancy, and TROPICO providing the supervisory services, to evolve a self-sustaining strategy of utilizing park entrance fee for conservation related aspects. This experience gained from this pilot model for ecotourism is now replicated in other parks in Bolivia. Other strategies adopted for conservation of the reserve were: Restricting visitor access to some of the reserve's vulnerable resources; providing natural gas and solar energy as cooking fuel replacing wood cutting from the reserve; agricultural extension services to educate farmers on better methods of farming; improvement of infrastructure in the reserve including staffing for patrolling and security; and collection of scientific data.

See also
Salvador Dalí Desert
Sol de Mañana
Laguna Blanca
Salar de Chalviri
Portezuelo del Cajón

References

External links 

 Eduardo Avaroa Andean Fauna National Reserve (in Spanish)

Protected areas of Bolivia
Geography of Potosí Department
Protected areas established in 1973
Tourist attractions in Potosí Department
1973 establishments in Bolivia